Mendocino (Spanish for "of Mendoza") is an unincorporated community and census-designated place (CDP) in Mendocino County, California, United States. The population of the CDP was 932 at the 2020 census. The town's name comes from Cape Mendocino  to the north, named by early Spanish navigators in honor of Antonio de Mendoza, Viceroy of New Spain.

Despite its small size, the town's scenic location on a headland surrounded by the Pacific Ocean has made it extremely popular as an artists' colony and with vacationers.

History 

Prior to 1850, a Pomo settlement named Buldam was located near Mendocino on the north bank of the Big River. In 1850, the ship Frolic was wrecked a few miles north of Mendocino, at Point Cabrillo, and the investigation of the wreck by agents of Henry Meiggs sparked the development of the timber industry in the area. Mendocino itself was founded in 1852 as a logging community for what became the Mendocino Lumber Company, and was originally named "Meiggsville" after Meiggs. The town was also known as "Big River" Meiggstown, and "Mendocino City", before the current name was settled on. The first post office opened in 1858. Many of the town's early settlers were New Englanders, as was true of many older Northern California logging towns. Portuguese fishermen from the Azores also settled in the area, as did immigrants from Canton Province in China, who built the Taoist Temple of Kwan Tai in town.

Mendocino's economy declined after 1940, and it became a somewhat isolated village with a shrinking population. The revitalization of the town began in the late 1950s with the founding of the Mendocino Art Center by artist Bill Zacha.

Most of the town was added to the National Register of Historic Places in 1971 as the Mendocino and Headlands Historic District. Mendocino Presbyterian Church on Main Street, dedicated on July 5, 1868, is one of the oldest continuously used Protestant churches in California, and is designated as California Historical Landmark #714. In addition, the Temple of Kwan Tai on Albion Street, California Historical Landmark #927, may be as old as 1854 and is one of the oldest Chinese houses of worship in California.

Since 1987, Mendocino has been the site of the Mendocino Music Festival, a classically based but musically diverse series of concerts that is held annually in a huge circus-type performance tent on the town's Main Street in the Mendocino Headlands State Park.

The Kelley House Museum has a cannon from the Frolic.

In 2021, there was a water shortage which forced businesses to transport their own drinking water.

Geography
California State Route 1 (Shoreline Highway) runs along the eastern edge of the downtown area; it leads north  to Fort Bragg and south  to Manchester.

The Big River forms the southern edge of the community and joins the Pacific Ocean at Big River Beach within Mendocino Headlands State Park, a quarter mile south of the center of town.

In 2021, some aquifers feeding the settlement's demand for water failed. Water is now brought in by tankers, and local businesses have fitted chemical toilets to conserve water.

Climate
Mendocino has a cool summer Maritime Mediterranean climate. Summers are characterized by frequent fog and highs mostly in the upper sixties and lows in the fifties. Winters rarely, if ever, see frost or snow, due to close proximity to the Pacific Ocean.

This region experiences warm (but not hot) and dry summers, with no average monthly temperatures above .  According to the Köppen Climate Classification system, Mendocino has a warm-summer Mediterranean climate, abbreviated "Csb" on climate maps.

Demographics

2010
At the 2010 census Mendocino had a population of 894. The racial makeup of Mendocino was 834 (93.3%) White, 5 (0.6%) African American, 8 (0.9%) Native American, 13 (1.5%) Asian, 1 (0.1%) Pacific Islander, 6 (0.7%) from other races, and 27 (3.0%) from two or more races. Hispanic or Latino of any race were 42 people (4.7%).

The census reported that 830 people (92.8% of the population) lived in households, 64 (7.2%) lived in non-institutionalized group quarters, and no one was institutionalized.

There were 447 households, 62 (13.9%) had children under the age of 18 living in them, 177 (39.6%) were opposite-sex married couples living together, 22 (4.9%) had a female householder with no husband present, 15 (3.4%) had a male householder with no wife present.  There were 29 (6.5%) unmarried opposite-sex partnerships, and 6 (1.3%) same-sex married couples or partnerships. 178 households (39.8%) were one person and 83 (18.6%) had someone living alone who was 65 or older. The average household size was 1.86.  There were 214 families (47.9% of households); the average family size was 2.41.

The age distribution was 93 people (10.4%) under the age of 18, 58 people (6.5%) aged 18 to 24, 166 people (18.6%) aged 25 to 44, 333 people (37.2%) aged 45 to 64, and 244 people (27.3%) who were 65 or older.  The median age was 56.1 years. For every 100 females, there were 89.8 males.  For every 100 females age 18 and over, there were 83.7 males.

There were 617 housing units at an average density of 83.1 per square mile, of the occupied units 271 (60.6%) were owner-occupied and 176 (39.4%) were rented. The homeowner vacancy rate was 3.9%; the rental vacancy rate was 9.2%.  520 people (58.2% of the population) lived in owner-occupied housing units and 310 people (34.7%) lived in rental housing units.

2000
At the 2000 census there were 824 people, 424 households, and 220 families in the CDP. The racial makeup of the CDP was 95.51% White, 0.36% Native American, 1.09% Asian, 0.73% from other races, and 2.31% from two or more races. Hispanic or Latino of any race were 2.79%.

Of the 424 households 18.4% had children under the age of 18 living with them, 43.2% were married couples living together, 6.8% had a female householder with no husband present, and 47.9% were non-families. 38.0% of households were one person and 15.6% were one person aged 65 or older.  The average household size was 1.94 and the average family size was 2.51.

The age distribution was 15.5% under the age of 18, 3.5% from 18 to 24, 20.6% from 25 to 44, 38.0% from 45 to 64, and 22.3% 65 or older.  The median age was 51 years. For every 100 females, there were 78.0 males.  For every 100 females age 18 and over, there were 75.3 males.

The median household income was $44,107 and the median family income was $59,167. Males had a median income of $41,667 versus $29,875 for females. The per capita income for the CDP was $29,348.  About 6.3% of families and 13.3% of the population were below the poverty line, including 7.3% of those under age 18 and 17.8% of those age 65 or over.

Economy
Mendocino is home to a large number of hotels and bed and breakfasts.  It has a downtown commercial district facing the ocean, with a number of art galleries, retail shops, lodging and restaurants.

Mendocino is one of the many small California towns facing severe water scarcity. Many of the region's wells, the town's primary water source, have run dry, so water is being brought in by truck at a cost of 20 to 45 cents per gallon. There are concerns that towns and cities in the county will stop selling water to Mendocino altogether: Fort Bragg, a city  to the north, took this step in July 2021 because of concerns about their own water shortage.

Politics

In popular culture 
Many films and movies have been filmed in and around Mendocino and Mendocino County, including Dying Young, The Russians Are Coming; Overboard; The Dunwich Horror; The Karate Kid Part III; Dead & Buried; Forever Young; Same Time Next Year; Racing with the Moon; Pontiac Moon; and The Majestic. 
Mendocino was depicted as turn-of-the-20th-century Monterey in the James Dean classic East of Eden, and it served as a New England resort town in Summer of '42 (the latter film featuring numerous local Mendocino High School students as extras).

The Sir Douglas Quintet had a number 27 hit with their song "Mendocino" (from the album of the same name) in early 1969.

The singers Kate & Anna McGarrigle wrote and sang the 1976 song  "Talk to Me of Mendocino" about someone returning to the happiness of the town after unhappy experiences in New York.

The TV series Murder, She Wrote has had perhaps the largest impact on the community. Murder, She Wrote was set in the fictional town of Cabot Cove, Maine. Nine episodes of the 264-episode program were filmed in Mendocino, while exterior shots throughout Mendocino were used in the remaining episodes. The program was broadcast for 12 seasons, from September 1984 until May 1996 on CBS,  and won many awards.  Many local residents looked forward to the yearly filming, as over a hundred and fifty were chosen to play background parts. A lucky few were cast for speaking roles. Poet, playwright and actor Lawrence Bullock cites being cast in a speaking role as a "Townsperson" in the episode "Indian Giver" as giving him eligibility to join the Screen Actors' Guild. Locals Linda Pack, James Henderson and others were also cast in speaking roles. The residence of the main character Jessica Fletcher was an actual home in Mendocino and is now a bed and breakfast under the name "Blair House."

While scenes for Murder, She Wrote were being filmed in Mendocino, residents say that it was common to see Angela Lansbury, who played Jessica Fletcher, stop to speak with a toddler, or for Tom Bosley to sign his autograph on a Glad Bag box presented by a shopper stepping out of the local grocery store. Murder, She Wrote also brought in more money to the town due to increased tourism — by some estimates, around $2,000,000.  The local high school band appeared in one of the episodes and received enough money from the appearance to go on a band trip.

Mendocino is also the home of the Mendocino Film Festival which was first held in May 2006. Because the area is a haven for artists, the festival honors them with a special "artist category", in addition to the documentary, feature and short film categories.

Cliffs of Mendocino, a musical arrangement composed by Alan Lee Silva that is designed for developing middle and high school bands, was also inspired by and named after the community.

Sister city
Mendocino is a sister city with Miasa, Japan, a relationship formed due to the friendship of Mendocino artist Bill Zacha and Japanese artist Tōshi Yoshida that was formalized in 1980.
Every other year, Miasa students visit Mendocino middle school students.

Parks and recreation
Friendship Park, a municipal sports playing field, was opened in April 1993.

Local state parks 

 Mendocino Headlands State Park
 Mendocino Woodlands State Park
 Russian Gulch State Park
 Point Cabrillo Light Station

See also
 Mendocino Unified School District

References

External links

 
 IMDB listing of films shot in Mendocino

Artist colonies
Populated coastal places in California
Census-designated places in Mendocino County, California
Populated places established in 1850
1850 establishments in California
Census-designated places in California